Vantaa light rail is a planned light rail system in Vantaa, Finland. Its proposed route connects Mellunkylä, Hakunila, Tikkurila, Aviapolis and Helsinki Airport. The construction may start at the earliest in 2023, with a projected finishing date of 2028.

The average speed of the system is estimated to be 24 km/h. At its fastest it may travel up to 70 km/h. The trip from Hakunila to Tikkurila would be 10 minutes, and from Tikkurila to Jumbo 13 minutes. From Tikkurila to the airport it would take about half an hour. The planned capacity is 170 passengers per rail car.

The estimated cost of the project is 300 million euros, of which the city of Vantaa would pay a third. The national government is hoped to contribute 30 percent, and the third payer might be Helsinki, as the line ends in its municipality.

References

External links 

 Proposal (pdf, 2018)
 General plan (pdf, 2018-02-23)

Proposed public transport in Finland
Tram transport in Finland
Transport in Vantaa
2028 in rail transport